Sachin Gupta (born 9 March 1978) is an Indian film producer, writer and director. He produces films under Chilsag Motion Pictures and is also an artistic director of Chilsag Chillies Theatre Company. He made his writing and directorial debut with the critically acclaimed film Paranthe Wali Gali (2014). He also shot to fame with Pakhi (2018).  Gupta's sojourn into theatre started when he was 12 years old, and to date he has staged more than 100 shows around the world, working as an actor, director and playwright. His award-winning Off Broadway plays include Celebration of Life, Handicapped City, and Kailashnath weds Madhumati. He staged these in New York and in Toronto, Canada for which he got huge appreciation amongst theatre lovers in North America. Sachin Gupta was also the recipient of the Natya Bhushan award in 2012.

Education
Sachin Gupta was born in New Delhi, India on 9 March 1978. He did his schooling at Summer Fields School, Kailash Colony New Delhi, and then attended Engineering College in Noida UP, India from where he received his bachelor's degree in computer engineering. Later he completed his MBA Degree from Symbiosis Pune. After this he went on to Stratford-upon-Avon in London to study and research William Shakespeare. This inspired him to then go to Fanshawe College in Canada to study theatre. While studying in Ontario he started the Canadian chapter of his theatre company, which immediately became a huge success. He went on to study management programs at Harvard University and studied acting at Lee Strasberg Theatre Institute, New York. He has also learned nuances of Shakespearean acting at the Emerson College in the US, and did a case study on Harvard University's American Repertory Theatre. Even while studying management programs, his end goal was theatre acting and filmmaking. He then used everything he learnt at Harvard to fuel his passion into the entertainment industry.

Film career
Gupta made his writing and directorial debut with the critically acclaimed film Paranthe Wali Gali (2014), produced by Chilsag Motion Pictures, a production company he established in 2012.

Theatre career
Sachin's sojourn into theatre started when he was 12 years old, and to date he has staged seventy-five shows around the world working as an actor, director and playwright. His award-winning Off Broadway plays include Celebration of Life, Handicapped City and Kailashnath weds Madhumati. He staged these in New York and in Toronto, Canada for which he got huge appreciation amongst theatre lovers in North America. His acting career started in his school days where he starred in and produced plays. This continued in college as well, as he slowly developed a passion for theatre and performing arts.

In December 2002 he started his Chilsag Chillies Theatre Company, which has produced thirteen original theatre productions written and directed by him addressing various social issues. He has trained more than 300 actors in various acting programs under the acting school he began in 2004. The company's very first production, Celebration of Life, was felicitated by the chief minister of Delhi, Sheila Dikshit, and was also appreciated internationally when it was performed at the Factory Theatre, Toronto, Canada and Off-Broadway Theare, New York. Chilsag tied up with the Actor's Experimental Lab in the United States and established Salgane School of Acting in 2003. In 2004, Chilsag Chillies received letters of appreciation from Dr. APJ Abdul Kalam (former President of India), Shivraj Patil (former Home Minister, India) and the Italian cultural centre and Department of Art and Culture, Government of India for the contribution to theatre. In late 2004, Chilsag laid the foundation of a new venture operationalising corporate theatre across its units. Theatre Pasta, an international theatre magazine, was launched in 2005. Chilsag also stages two of its productions in locations across London in three days with its pack of English actors.

In 2005, Gupta conducted the Three Days Chilsag Chillies Theatre Festival, where he directed eight plays including four full-length plays over three days. Mid-2006 witnessed the initiation of Chilsag Children's Theatre Company and Theatre-in-Education projects. Chilsag Theatre Pasta International Awards successfully started its journey in beginning of 2007. The company staged the premier of its plays A Rollercoaster Ride, Wake Up Call, and Kailashnath Weds Madhumati at one of the premier performing arts location in the capital city, New Delhi. Chilsag took its theatre productions Celebration of Life and Handicapped City to the international forum through shows Off-Broadway (New York City), Factory Theatre (Canada), locations across Boston, West Virginia, and other cities. This year marked the launch of International Repertory for Chilsag with American actors.

In 2009, Chilsag started its own Drama Therapy Centre. Late 2010 witnessed a collaboration with Indian Council for Cultural Relations and production of the play Wake Up Call. In 2011, director Sachin Gupta received the Natya Bhushan, the highest ranking award for his contribution to Hindi theatre. 2015 also witnessed the conceptualisation and production of the biggest musical to be staged in the capital city, Chota Bheem The Musical, which was attended by over 18,000 in the Siri Fort Auditorium. In 2016, Chilsag signed a six-film deal with United States-based production house for the production of meaningful cinema and short films. A new production, Kafan, was also staged in 2017 with collaboration with the Indo-American Friendship Association and supported by the Ministry of Culture.

Internationally, he marked his debut in 2005 as he moved to North America to expand his film and theatre work. Since then he has performed the world over, including major cities like New York, Toronto, London, Birmingham, Boston, Philadelphia, Mumbai, New Delhi, Kolkata, Ontario, Orissa, Bangalore, and Goa. He has been invited to perform at some of the most prestigious international festivals. In 2011 he staged his theatre production The Play Begins @8pm in Orissa while working as an actor along with film actor and playback singer Vasundhara Das.

Film and television actors who have worked with Gupta's theatre company include Huma Qureshi, Jitin Gulati, Deepak Wadhwa, Vasundhara Das, Gauri Karnik, Anjum Farooki, Nausheen Ali Sardar, Anuj Saxena, Prerna Wanvari, Kashmira Irani, Shraddha Musale, Rubina Dilaik and Neha Pawar.

He also acted in the play Kailash Nath Weds Madhumati, an Off Broadway musical comedy production in New York in 2009.

Short films

Music videos

References

External links
 
 

Lee Strasberg Theatre and Film Institute alumni
Hindi-language film directors
20th-century Indian dramatists and playwrights
Indian male dramatists and playwrights
Living people
Indian theatre directors
Artists from Delhi
1978 births
Indian male screenwriters
Hindi film producers
Film directors from Mumbai
20th-century Indian male writers